Gunnar Berntsen (born 30 October 1977 in Frankfurt (Oder), East Germany) is a retired German football player. He spent two seasons in the Bundesliga with FC Energie Cottbus.

References

External links
 

1977 births
Living people
German footballers
FC Energie Cottbus players
FC Energie Cottbus II players
1. FC Frankfurt players
Bundesliga players
2. Bundesliga players
Association football goalkeepers
Sportspeople from Frankfurt (Oder)
Footballers from Brandenburg